North Greenville University is a private Baptist university in Tigerville, South Carolina.  It is affiliated with the South Carolina Baptist Convention (Southern Baptist Convention). It is accredited by the Southern Association of Colleges and Schools. The institution awards bachelor's, master's, and doctoral degrees.

History
NGU was founded in 1892 and named North Greenville High School, the first high school in the northern portion of Greenville County.  Land for the school was donated by Benjamin F. Neves.  It was operated by the North Greenville Baptist Association, and was set up to expand educational offerings in the mountainous northern portion of Greenville County.

The school received a state charter in 1904.  It was taken over by the Southern Baptist Convention's Home Mission Board a year later, and renamed North Greenville Baptist Academy in 1915.  The North Greenville Baptist Association reassumed control of the school in 1929.

In 1934, the academy was expanded to include a junior college.  In 1949, it was transferred to the South Carolina Baptist Convention, which renamed the school North Greenville Junior College a year later.  In 1957, it was accredited as a two-year college, and high school courses were dropped altogether.  It was renamed simply North Greenville College in 1972.

NGC began offering its first junior- and senior-level classes in 1992, in Christian studies and church music and added a teacher education program in 1997. In the following years, a variety of other bachelor's degree programs were added, including English, History, Spanish, Psychology, Business, Economics, Criminal Justice, Theatre, Communications, Outdoor Leadership, Interdisciplinary Studies, Biology, and Mathematics, among other subjects. NGU assumed university status in 2006 and began granting master's degrees as well.

NGU was granted an exception to Title IX in 2015 which allows it to legally discriminate against LGBT students for religious reasons. It is ranked among the "Absolute Worst Campuses for LGBTQ Youth" by Campus Pride. Homosexual acts and all sex outside of marriage are grounds for expulsion from the school.

Accreditation 
It is affiliated with the South Carolina Baptist Convention (Southern Baptist Convention).

Athletics

The North Greenville (NGU) athletic teams are called the Crusaders. The university is a member of the NCAA Division II ranks, primarily competing in the Conference Carolinas (CC; formerly known as the Carolinas–Virginia Athletic Conference (CVAC) until after the 2006–07 school year) since the 2011–12 academic year. They were also a member of the National Christian College Athletic Association (NCCAA), primarily competing as an independent in the South Region of the Division I level. The Crusaders previously competed as a member of the Mid-South Conference (MSC) of the National Association of Intercollegiate Athletics (NAIA) from 1995–96 to 2000–01.

NGU competes in 20 intercollegiate varsity sports: Men's sports include baseball, basketball, cross country, football, golf, lacrosse, soccer, tennis, track & field and volleyball; while women's sports include basketball, cross country, golf, lacrosse, soccer, softball, tennis, track & field and volleyball; and co-ed sports include cheerleading.

Baseball
The baseball team won the national NCAA Division II baseball tournament in 2022.

Notable alumni
 Mac Brunson, 1978, Senior Pastor of Valleydale Baptist Church, Alabama; former Senior pastor of FBC Dallas and FBC Jacksonville
 Seth Condrey, Christian musician
 Donna Scott Davenport, embattled Rutherford County, Tennessee, juvenile court judge
 Steven Furtick, 2002, Founder and Lead Pastor Elevation Church, Charlotte, North Carolina
 Clayton Holmes, former NFL player
 Josh Kimbrell, 2007, youngest Senator in the South Carolina legislature
 Freddie Martino, NFL player
 John Michael McConnell, 1964, former US Director of National Intelligence
 Chris Sligh, 2003, songwriter, recording artist, and Season Six American Idol finalist

References

External links
 
 Official athletics website

 
Universities and colleges affiliated with the Southern Baptist Convention
Educational institutions established in 1891
Universities and colleges accredited by the Southern Association of Colleges and Schools
1891 establishments in South Carolina
Council for Christian Colleges and Universities
Private universities and colleges in South Carolina